"Pilot" is a song by American rapper 50 Cent, released on March 25, 2014, as the third single from his album Animal Ambition. It is the only single off the album to chart on the Bubbling Under Hot 100 Singles Chart.

Track listing 
Digital single
"Pilot"

Music video 
On March 25, 2014, the music video for the song was released.

Chart performance

References 

2014 singles
2014 songs
50 Cent songs
G-Unit Records singles
Caroline Records singles
Songs written by 50 Cent